The South Tyrol Arena (in Italian Arena Alto Adige; in German Südtirol Arena) is a biathlon stadium in the municipality of Rasen-Antholz, in South Tyrol (Italy).

The facility will host the biathlon competitions of the 2026 Winter Olympics of Milan-Cortina.

History 

The facility, which began construction in 1969 and opened in 1971, has regularly hosted a stage of the Biathlon World Cup, as well as six editions of the Biathlon World Championships (1975, 1976, 1983, 1995, 2007, and 2020) and two editions of the Biathlon Junior World Championships (1975 and 1983).

The stadium was modernized from 2006: the grandstand for spectators was enlarged and a building was built for the competition judges. The total expenditure was 6.9 million euro.

2007 World Championship were attended by 117,000 spectators, with peaks of 23,000 on Saturday 10 February.

Venue 
The arena is located at the end of Antholz Valley (side valley of Puster Valley) at an altitude of 1600 m above sea level, near the Lake of Antholz. It is the highest biathlon venue of the World Cup.

Reference

External links 

 (DE, EN, IT)  
 (DE, EN, IT)  

Biathlon in Italy
Venues of the 2026 Winter Olympics
Sports venues completed in 1971
1971 establishments in Italy